The 1911 East Cork by-election was held on 15 July 1911.  The by-election was held due to the election being declared void of the incumbent Irish Parliamentary MP, Anthony Donelan.  It was won by the Irish Parliamentary candidate John Muldoon.

References

1911 elections in Ireland
1911 elections in the United Kingdom
By-elections to the Parliament of the United Kingdom in County Cork constituencies
Unopposed by-elections to the Parliament of the United Kingdom (need citation)
July 1911 events